Portugal competed at the 2008 Summer Paralympics in Beijing. The country participated with 35 competitors in seven sports.

Medalists

Athletics 

Men

Women

Boccia 

Four gold medalists from the 2004 Games—João Paulo Fernandes, Cristina Gonçalves, António Marques and Fernando Ferreira—returned to compete in Beijing. The boccia national team's coach is Helena Bastos. Portugal was expected to be a strong contender in this sport as it is regarded as one of the most successful countries ever.

Cycling 

Men

Equestrian

Rowing

Swimming 
 

Men

Women

Sailing

See also
Portugal at the Paralympics
Portugal at the 2008 Summer Olympics

References

External links
Beijing 2008 Paralympic Games Official Site
International Paralympic Committee

Nations at the 2008 Summer Paralympics
2008
Paralympics